Tiffany Liou (born August 31, 1990) is a Taiwanese-American multi-media journalist, reporter and anchor. She is currently a multi-media journalist at  ABC's  affiliate WFAA in Dallas, Texas. Liou has worked for all three major television networks in the U.S.

Liou won a Heartland Emmy Award in 2019 for her story documenting the eighth anniversary of the 2010 Haiti earthquake.

Education
Liou attended Harker School in San Jose, California, from the seventh grade onward and graduated in 2008. She studied communications and marketing at Santa Clara University's Leavey School of Business, graduating with a business degree.

Career

After undertaking an internship at ABC/KGO-TV in San Francisco, California, and a broadcast journalism class at Ohlone College, in Fremont, California, Liou was hired as Overnight Assignment Editor at FOX/KTVU-2 in Oakland, California, in June 2012. In October 2013 she briefly joined KTVE/NBC-10 and KARD/FOX-14 in West Monroe, Louisiana, before being hired by KWQC TV 6 News/NBC in Davenport, Iowa, in March 2014. In March 2016, Liou joined KWTV News 9 in Oklahoma City, Oklahoma. She assumed her current role, at WFAA in Dallas, Texas, in April 2018.

Following the March 2021 Atlanta spa shootings, Liou's commentary, "We need you to fight alongside us to stop Asian hate" on WFAA was rebroadcast on other stations including WXIA-TV in Atlanta and  KVUE in Austin.

Liou is co-president of the Texas chapter of the Asian American Journalists Association.

In 2021, Liou was nominated for three Heartland Emmy Awards: one as a reporter, one as a writer and one as a producer.

Personal life
In addition to English, Liou speaks Taiwanese and Mandarin Chinese.

Awards 
Liou won a Heartland Emmy Award in 2019 for her story documenting the eighth anniversary of the 2010 Haiti earthquake. She has also won two Lone Star Emmy Awards, in 2019 and 2020.

References

External links
 Tiffany Liou - Twitter
 Tiffany Liou WFAA - Facebook
 Tiffany Liou - YouTube
 Tiffany Liou - Team Bios, WFAA.com

Living people
1990 births
21st-century American journalists
News & Documentary Emmy Award winners
American women television journalists
American television reporters and correspondents
American television news anchors
American people of Taiwanese descent
Journalists from California
The Harker School alumni
Ohlone College alumni
Santa Clara University alumni
21st-century American women